Stemple Creek is a  long, westward-flowing stream in the California counties of Sonoma and Marin, which feeds into the Estero de San Antonio. Its waters ultimately reach Bodega Bay, part of the Gulf of the Farallones National Marine Sanctuary on the Pacific Ocean.

Course
It passes south of Two Rock, California, then crosses into Marin County just west of Training Center Petaluma. The creek follows a sinuous course across northern West Marin, with bridges at Alexander Road, Twin Bridge Road, and State Route 1, to a confluence with the Estero de San Antonio just west of State Route 1.

Environmental factors
California's 1994 water quality report designated Stemple Creek as an "impaired" streamway as defined in section 303(d) of the Federal Water Resource Statutes, due to runoff from pasture land and feedlots. Pollutants found at hazardous level in the creek have included copper, ammonia, and zinc.

Bridges
Bridges cross Stemple Creek at Route One, Pepper Road, Twin Bridge Road, Alexander Road, Tomales Road, Valley Ford Road, Mecham Road, and Pepper Road.

See also
Americano Creek
List of watercourses in the San Francisco Bay Area

References

Rivers of Marin County, California
Rivers of Sonoma County, California
West Marin
Rivers of Northern California